Gwendolyn Sewell Wakeling (March 3, 1901 in Detroit, Michigan – June 16, 1982 in Los Angeles, California) was an American costume designer and the daughter of film editor/press agent Edith Wakeling.

Gwen Wakeling's first film was Cecil B. DeMille's 1927 epic The King of Kings. A generation later, she won an Academy Award for her work on DeMille's 1949 version of Samson and Delilah.

In a career spanning over 140 films, she worked for director John Ford on such films as The Prisoner of Shark Island (1936), Drums Along the Mohawk (1939), The Grapes of Wrath (1940) and How Green Was My Valley (1941), and provided the costumes for such Shirley Temple films as Little Miss Broadway in the 1930s. One of her last assignments was creating Barbara Eden's "Jeannie" costumes for I Dream Of Jeannie in 1965.

Wakeling was a member of the Baháʼí Faith, and her husband, Henry J. Staudigl, set up an arts endowment in her memory at Bosch Baháʼí School in Santa Cruz to promote artistic endeavors and included a research and resource library.

References

External links
Gwen Wakeling costume design drawings, Margaret Herrick Library, Academy of Motion Picture Arts and Sciences

1901 births
1982 deaths
20th-century Bahá'ís
American Bahá'ís
American costume designers
Artists from Detroit
Best Costume Design Academy Award winners
California people in fashion
Women costume designers